A free motion equation is a differential equation that describes a mechanical system in the absence of external forces, but in the presence only of an inertial force depending on the choice of a reference frame. 

 

 

where  is a connection on  associates with the initial reference frame . The right-hand side of this equation is treated as an inertial force. 

A free motion equation need not exist in general. It can be defined if and only if a configuration bundle 
 of a mechanical system is a toroidal cylinder .

See also

 Non-autonomous mechanics
 Non-autonomous system (mathematics)
 Analytical mechanics
 Fictitious force

References 

 De Leon, M., Rodrigues, P., Methods of Differential Geometry in Analytical Mechanics (North Holland, 1989).
 Giachetta, G., Mangiarotti, L., Sardanashvily, G., Geometric Formulation of Classical and Quantum Mechanics (World Scientific, 2010)    .

Theoretical physics
Classical mechanics
Differential equations
Dynamical systems